Brahim Who?, is a 1982 Moroccan drama film directed by Nabyl Lahlou. It was screened at multiple national and international film festivals, including the Berlin International Film Festival.

Synopsis 
The film tells the story of story of a Brahim Boumalfi, a retiree who, after working for fifty years at the same company, has not received a pension in over two years.

Cast 

 Larbi Doghmi
 Nadia Atbib
 Amina Rachid 
 Hammadi Ammor
 Allal Saadi
 Mostafa Hassan Belhadj

References 

Moroccan drama films
1982 drama films
1980s Arabic-language films
1982 films
Films directed by Nabyl Lahlou